This is a list of finance ministers of Samoa.

Leicester Mitchell Cook, 1952–1959 (Financial Secretary)
Eugene Paul, 1959–1961
Fred Betham, 1961–1970
Tofa Siaosi, 1970–1973
Sam Saili, 1973–1975
Aumua Ioane, 1975–1976
Vaovasamanaia Filipo, 1976–1982
Tofilau Eti, 1982–1984
Tuilaepa Aiono Sailele Malielegaoi, 1984–1985
Faasootauloa Semu Plagi 1985–?
Sam Saili, ?–1986–1987
Faasootauloa Pualanga, 1987–1988
Tuilaepa Aiono Sailele Malielegaoi, 1988–2001
Misa Telefoni, 2001—2006
Niko Lee Hang, 2006—2011
Faumuina Tiatia Liuga, 2011–2014
Tuilaepa Aiono Sailele Malielegaoi, 2014–2016
Sili Epa Tuioti, 2016–2021
 Mulipola Anarosa Ale Molioo, 2021–

References

Finance
Finance Ministers
Politicians